The Association of Danish Law Firms (Danish: Danske Advokater) is a trade and employers’ organization for law firms in Denmark. It is a member of the International Bar Association.

History
The Association of Danish Law Firms was disjoined from the Danish Bar and Law Society in January 2008 as a result of a revision of the Danish Administration of Law Act. Its first managing director was Frank Jensen. He was succeeded by Paul Mollerup in 2009.

Building
The Association of Danish Law Frims is based at Vesterbrogade 32 in Copenhagen. The building is the former mid-19th century entertainment venue Valencia. The building originally fronted  the street but was later hemmed in by a taller building to the front and an extension to the rear. The building is owned by Dreyers Fond and was adapted for its current use by Dorte Mandrup Architects in 2015. The transformation exposed some of the original building details. The old gabled façade, featuring three tall, arched windows, now fronts  an interior courtyard.

Activities
The Association of Danish Law Frims contributes actively to the law-making process by participating in the governmental hearing procedures as well as appointing members to governmental committees. It publishes the magazine Danske Advokater.

References

External links
 Official website

 
Employers' organizations in Denmark
Organizations based in Copenhagen
Organizations established in 2008